W. Ian Thomas (13 September 1914 – 1 August 2007) was an evangelist, Christian evangelical writer, theological teacher and founder of the Torchbearers Bible schools.

At the age of 12, he was invited to a Bible study group of the Crusaders Christian Youth Movement, by a 13 year old lad. The following summer, still 12 years old, he was converted to Christ at a Crusaders Union camp.

At the age of 15, he was convinced that he should devote all of his life to the service of the Lord Jesus. He began to preach out in the open air at Hampstead Heath. He was also actively engaged in Sunday School work as well as in the Crusaders' Bible class. 

He decided the best thing for him to do was to become a doctor. At the university, Ian became a leader in the Inter-Varsity Fellowship group. He started a slum club down in the East End of London "out of a sheer desire to win souls, to go out and get them. I was a windmill of activity until, at the age of 19, every moment of my day was packed tight with doing things. Thus by the age of 19, I had been reduced to a state of complete exhaustion spiritually, and I felt that there was no point going on."

"Then, one night in November, that year just at midnight, I got down on my knees before God, and I just wept in sheer despair. I said, 'With all my heart I have wanted to serve Thee. I have tried to my uttermost and I am a hopeless failure.' That night things happened. The Lord seemed to make plain to me that night, through my tears of bitterness: 'You see, for seven years, with utmost sincerity, you have been trying to live for Me, on My behalf, the life that I have been waiting for 7 years to live through you.'" Thomas later reflected: "I got up the next morning to an entirely different Christian life, but I want to emphasize this: I had not received one iota more than I had already had for seven years!"

Major Thomas served in the British Expeditionary Force in Belgium at the outset of World War II and taking part in the evacuation at Dunkirk. He would also spend time during the war in France, Italy, and Greece (often, fighting).

When he was not traveling, Major Thomas resided in Estes Park, Colorado, with his wife, Joan Thomas, and his son Chris, Chris Thomas.

Biography

Early life 
Ian Thomas was born in London on 13 September 1914.

He joined the British Army in World War II. He was decorated with the D.S.O. (Distinguished Service Order) for conspicuous gallantry in taking out a German machine gun nest, and the T.D. (Territorial Decoration). When the Germans surrendered at the Battle of Monte Cassino, Major W. Ian Thomas went and took the flag of surrender.

Life 
After his service in the British Army, Ian Thomas was probably best known as a Bible teacher, author, and as the founder of both Capernwray Missionary Fellowship of Torchbearers (based at Capernwray Hall, England) and subsequently Torchbearers International (based in US).

Books 

 The Saving Life of Christ, Zondervan Publishing, Grand Rapids, Michigan, 1961. 
 The Mystery of Godliness, Zondervan Publishing, Grand Rapids, Michigan, 1964. 
 If I Perish, I Perish : the Christian Life as seen in Esther, Zondervan Publishing, Grand Rapids, Michigan, 1968. 
 The Indwelling Life of Christ : All of Him in All of Me, Multnomah Publishers Inc, Oregon, 2006. 

His first book, The Saving Life of Christ, seems to have had a profound effect on Bert Harned, M.D., and the many individuals he has discipled in his lifetime.  This can be seen in Harned's book, Any Old Bush – Christ Living in Us.

Death 
Thomas died on 1 August 2007 at the age of 92.

Footnotes

Further reading 
Go a Little Further: W. Ian Thomas and the Torchbearers Story

1914 births
2007 deaths
English Christian religious leaders
English evangelicals